Male waxing is the practice of male pubic hair removal. After the increased popularity of female pubic hair styling or removal, commonly called bikini waxing, male waxing became more common in the 1990s, although the number of practitioners historically and currently is unknown.

Male waxing is popular in the body building and modeling communities. The pubic hair removal style that involves removal of all the pubic hair is called the sphinx wax.

Unlike the many styling possibilities for removal of female pubic hair, the male practice is mainly total removal, sometimes called manzilian, a contraction of "male Brazilian", or "brozilian". However waxing salons typically offer variations on total hair removal from the genital area and often include other parts of the body in combinations of services offered to the clientele. A popular combination is known as "the back, sack and crack", where the back, the scrotum and the perianal region between the buttocks are depilated. Hair may be removed from the penis too.

Technique
The technique of male pubic hair removal is very similar to that used during bikini waxing. Waxing involves the thin spreading of a wax combination over the skin. A cloth or paper strip is then pressed on the top and ripped off with a quick movement against the direction of hair growth. This removes the wax along with the hair and dead skin cells, leaving the skin smooth. Home waxing kits have become increasingly popular over the years.  A hard wax which does not require the cloth paper strip is sometimes used on the more sensitive areas such as the scrotum or penis. A light oil such as baby oil can be applied to those sensitive areas before wax is applied to reduce wax adhesion to the skin.  It is desirable to not cover the genitals with a modesty towel when using oil since the towel can absorb the protective oil, lessening its effectiveness. Application of egg oil for a few days post waxing can help moisturise the skin and reduce inflammation, pain or growth of bacteria.

Sugaring is an alternative to waxing. It is claimed to be less painful during application and less irritating to sensitive areas such as the scrotum. The application technique differs from waxing in that hair is pulled out in the same direction as the hair's growth.

Benefits 
There are benefits to waxing compared to other forms of hair removal. Removal of male pubic hair by waxing is a long-lasting method but can be painful if the man is not used to it or doing it for the first time.

Hair in waxed areas will not grow back for three to eight weeks; when the hair does grow back, it is soft and thin. When hair is shaved or removed by depilatory cream, the hair is removed at the surface rather than the root. In a few days, the hair can be seen at the surface. Areas that are repeatedly waxed over long periods of time often exhibit a thinning of regrowth, and regrowth that is thinner, softer, and lighter in color. The use of a hair inhibitor will also aid the slow re-growth of hair; used over a long period of time this can be used as an almost permanent method.

Potential dangers 
Some physicians do not recommend waxing for persons suffering from diabetes or who have varicose veins or poor circulation as they are more susceptible to infection.

Patients on Retin-A, Renova, Differin or isotretinoin have been advised by doctors not to have waxing performed; these medications can weaken the skin, and lead to tearing of the skin.

References

External links
 Epilated male genitalia on Wikimedia Commons

Hair removal
Pubic hair